The 2015 Arimex ATP Challenger Trophy was a professional tennis tournament played on clay courts. It was the ninth edition of the tournament which was part of the 2015 ATP Challenger Tour. It took place at the TC EMPIRE in Trnava, Slovakia from 21 to 27 September 2015.

Singles main-draw entrants

Seeds

 1 Rankings are as of September 14, 2015.

Other entrants
The following players received wildcards into the singles main draw:
  Martin Blaško
  Artem Dubrivnyy
  Alex Molčan
  Dominik Šproch

The following player received a special exemption into the singles main draw:
  Artem Smirnov

The following players received entry from the qualifying draw:
  Riccardo Bellotti
  Lenny Hampel
  Miloslav Mečíř Jr. 
  Tristan-Samuel Weissborn

The following player received entry as a lucky loser:
  Václav Šafránek

Champions

Singles

  Robin Haase def.  Horacio Zeballos, 6–4, 6–1

Doubles

 Wesley Koolhof /  Matwé Middelkoop def.  Kamil Majchrzak /  Stéphane Robert, 6–4, 6–2

External links
Official Website

Trophy
Arimex Challenger Trophy
STRABAG Challenger Open